Audrey Kathryn Lindvall (August 11, 1982 – August 2, 2006) was an American model.  She was the sister of supermodel Angela Lindvall, and the former face of Coach and Ann Taylor.

Biography
Born in Lee's Summit, Missouri, to Randall (a pharmacist) and Laura Rasdall, she graduated from Lee's Summit High School in June 2001. Growing up with four sisters and one brother, it was her sister, Michelle, that wanted to be a model.  Michelle and her other sister Angela, went to local Kansas City fashion shows.  It was Angela however that got noticed by Kim Hoffman of Hoffman International.

After Angela signed with IMG she made it to the top of the fashion world, landing on the cover of Vogue. It wasn't long before Audrey was noticed by agents and photographers when she visited her sister in New York. Audrey soon signed with Ivan Bart with IMG.

Audrey desired to do something ecological, such as designing earth-friendly houses. She used to play with crawdads as a kid and loved riding her bike. Very health conscious, Lindvall rode her bike in New York City, and did not think anything of riding in Lee's Summit, Missouri. She was hoping to attend college and to pursue other goals outside of modeling.

Audrey moved back to her father's house in Lee's Summit during July 2006, a stopping point on her move to Los Angeles, California, to be near Angela and her family. It was there that she was accidentally killed a month later.

The British band The Kooks dedicated one of their songs "Ooh La" to her memory.

Death
On August 2, 2006, nine days before her 24th birthday, Lindvall was killed by a truck in Lee's Summit, Missouri, while out on a bicycle ride with a friend. Lindvall's bike accidentally hit the concrete curb next to a QuikTrip convenience store and she was thrown from her bike, landing under the wheels of a moving gas tanker truck.

See also
List of people who died in road accidents

References

External links

1982 births
2006 deaths
Road incident deaths in Missouri
Cycling road incident deaths
Truck road incident deaths
Female models from Missouri
People from Lee's Summit, Missouri
20th-century American women
20th-century American people
21st-century American women